Solarussa is a comune (municipality) in the Province of Oristano in the Italian region Sardinia, located about  northwest of Cagliari and about  northeast of Oristano.

Solarussa borders the following municipalities: Bauladu, Oristano, Paulilatino, Siamaggiore, Simaxis, Tramatza, Zerfaliu.

Demographic evolution

References

External links

 www.comune.solarussa.or.it/sito/home/

Cities and towns in Sardinia